The 49th Golden Bell Awards (Mandarin:第49屆金鐘獎) was held on October 25, 2014 at Sun Yat-sen Memorial Hall in Taipei, Taiwan. The ceremony was broadcast live by CTV. Sam Tseng and Selina Jen emceed the ceremony.

Winners and nominees
Below is the list of winners and nominees for the main categories.

References

External links
 Official website of the 49th Golden Bell Awards

2014
2014 television awards
2014 in Taiwan